The Freycinet Plan was an ambitious public works programme, launched in 1878 by the Minister of Public Works Charles de Freycinet, principally for the construction of railways, but also for canals and maritime ports. In its initial codification – which very largely was superseded – the plan foresaw the hypothecation of 3 billion francs to the railway lines, 1 billion to the canals and 500 million to the ports.

Characteristics
The project became part of the Finance Act in January 1878. Freycinet, being close to Léon Gambetta and Léon Say, the Minister of Finance, organised a meeting between them all to prepare the political terrain. A first law was voted in on 18 May 1878, creating the Compagnie des Chemins de Fer de l'État ("State Railway Company"), by acquisition of several other companies.

On 8 June, a report was published. The main objective of the Freycinet plan was to give every French person access the railway, so as to favour the economic development of the country and to open up remote areas. It was made law on 17 July 1879.

They were built both by large private companies, mostly underwritten by the State, and by the State itself: Freycinet had formed the State Railway Company with the law of 18 May 1878.

In 1879, Freycinet became President of the Council of Ministers. He chose Henri Varroy to succeed him as Minister for Public Works and implement his plan. He brought in the engineer Alfred Picard, who was named Director of Railways in 1882.

The implementation of the Freycinet Plan took until 1914, and it was completed fully. However, many chefs-lieux were only served by small meandering metre gauge railways, of somewhat mediocre quality.

Classification of lines 

 The first list proposed by Freycinet starting in 1878 comprised 154 new lines and 53 lines already with concessions as voies ferrées d'intérêt local, and this list was discussed at length both in committee and by the Chamber of Deputies and the Senate.
 94 lines, totalling , were the object of amendments referred to the Minister of Public Works, and were not put into law.

Motivation 
Beside the economic considerations, the plan had a political objective: to promote the Third Republic in the rural areas, who were often hostile to the new régime.

Criticism 
According to some analysts, the Freycinet Plan caused considerable upheaval and can be shown to have been a cause of difficulties in French industry at the end of the 19th century in the competitive international economy.

Albert Broder, Professor of History at the University of Paris-XII, explains this forcefully:

References 

 
 

History of rail transport in France